ICC Cricket World Cup Associate Warm-up Matches are some cricket matches arranged by the International Cricket Council to Associate Nations for familiarisation of conditions in Australian and New Zealand. The tour is organised for the four qualifying teams (Afghanistan, Ireland, Scotland & United Arab Emirates) to aid their preparation for the 2015 World Cup.

These teams will play against local sides. Teams will be able to train with former cricketer and specialists coaches like Dav Whatmore as part of after joining the ICC High Performance Programme (HPP) in an advisory role.

Afghanistan Matches

1st Match

2nd Match

3rd Match

4th Match

5th Match

Ireland

1st Match

2nd Match

3rd Match

4th Match

5th Match

6th Match

7th Match

Scotland Matches

1st Match

2nd Match

3rd Match

4th Match

5th Match

6th Match

7th Match

United Arab Emirates Matches

1st Match

2nd Match

3rd Match

4th Match

5th Match

6th Match

References

External links
 United Arab Emirates tour of Australia and New Zealand 2014
 Fixture
 Ground

Associate tour of Australia and New Zealand
Associate tour of Australia and New Zealand
Associate tour of Australia and New Zealand
Associate tour of Australia and New Zealand
Associate tour of Australia and New Zealand